The Syriac Catholic Apostolic Exarchate of Venezuela is a Syriac Catholic Church missionary ecclesiastical territory or apostolic exarchate of the Catholic Church in Venezuela. It is exempt directly to the Holy See (specifically the Roman Congregation for the Oriental Churches) and not part of any ecclesiastical province.

Its cathedral is the Catedral Católica Siria de Nuestra Señora de la Asunción (dedicated to the Assumption of Mary), in the episcopal see of Maracay, Aragua, Venezuela.

History 
Pope John Paul II established the Apostolic Exarchate of Venezuela for Syriac Catholics on 22 June 2001.

Ordinaries 
 Denys Antoine Chahda (28 June 2001 – 13 September 2001), later Archeparch (Archbishop) of Aleppo of the Syriacs (Syria) (2001.09.13 – ...)
 Iwannis Louis Awad (17 May 2003 – retired 1 March 2011), emeritate as Titular Bishop of Zeugma in Syria (2003.05.17 – ...)
 Timoteo Hikmat Beylouni (1 March 2011 – ...), Titular Bishop of Sabrata (2011.03.01 – ...)

See also
 Roman Catholicism in Venezuela

References

Sources and external links
 GCatholic with incumbent biography links

Venezuela
Venezuela
Eastern Catholic dioceses in Venezuela
Syrian diaspora in South America
Arab Venezuelan
Christian organizations established in 2001
Roman Catholic dioceses and prelatures established in the 21st century
2001 establishments in Venezuela
Maracay